Buranda Busway Station is located in Brisbane, Australia serving the suburb of Buranda. It opened on 30 April 2001 when the South East Busway was extended from Woolloongabba to Eight Mile Plains.

On 29 August 2011, Buranda became a junction station when the Eastern Busway was extended to Langlands Park.

It is served by 12 routes operated by Brisbane Transport and Clarks Logan City Bus Service as part of the TransLink network.

Transport links
Buranda station is located adjacent to the Buranda railway station on the Cleveland line.

References

External links
[ Buranda station] TransLink

Bus stations in Brisbane
Transport infrastructure completed in 2001